SS Bardic was a Greek cargo ship that was shelled and sunk by the German battleship Scharnhorst in the Atlantic Ocean northwest of Cape Verde on 9 March 1941.

Construction 
Bardic was launched on 19 December 1918 and completed on 13 March 1919 at the Harland & Wolff Ltd. shipyard in Belfast, United Kingdom. The ship could generate 1138 n.h.p. with a speed of 11 knots.

1924 Incident 
While Bardic was on route from Australia to the United Kingdom on 31 August 1924, she ran aground on Stag Rock off Lizard Point, Cornwall. Her crew evacuated the ship yet her officers remained onboard until 8 September. The ship was eventually refloated on 29 September and towed to Falmouth, Cornwall where she was beached to await repairs.

Sinking 
On 9 March 1941, Bardic (then named Marathon) encountered the German battleship Scharnhorst in the Atlantic Ocean northwest of Cape Verde. The German battleship shelled and sunk the Marathon, with all the crew being taken as prisoners of war.

Wreck 

References

Ships of the Aberdeen Line
Ships of the White Star Line
Ships built by Harland and Wolff
Ships built in Belfast
Maritime incidents in 1924
Maritime incidents in March 1941
1918 ships
Cargo ships of Greece
Steamships of the United Kingdom
World War II shipwrecks in the Atlantic Ocean
Steamships of Greece